John Calarco (Johnny Cee) (born April 26, 1966) is an American musician from Milwaukee, Wisconsin. Calarco was drummer for many Milwaukee area bands. He also co-wrote and performed in several songs on the very successful Willy Porter album Dog Eared Dream and toured with Porter as his drummer. He has made an impact as both a touring performer and band member, recording artist, session musician and song writer/producer.

Career
Calarco has been a drummer in many bands in the Midwestern United States. He played drums for Big Bang Theory, Tony Brown, Greg Koch and the Tone Controls and the Willy Porter Band. From 1992 to 1997 Calarco played drums with the (three piece) Willy Porter band which included Steve Kleiber, (bass guitar). The band toured the United States with The Cranberries and Toad the Wet Sprocket performing the Willy Porter album.

As a form of anger management during the COVID-19 epidemic, he wrote a sardonic song about the never ending quest to find toilet paper In Toilet Paper Hunt he sings:"Now I stare at empty shelvesBecause of people only worried about themselvesI’m just sitting pumping gasWonderin’ how I’m gonna wipe my ass."

Calarco moved to New York City in 1997 to play with the Blue Man Group.

Awards
1997 WAMI (instrumentalist: Percussion)
2003 WAMI winner Drums/Percussionist of the Year 2003
2004 WAMI Drummer of the Year

Albums
2002 Pure... Solo Album (as Vellocet) 
2015 Shine Solo album

Contributions
 2007	Rewired: The Electric Collection Daryl Stuermer (Drums)
 2007	Live on the Radio	Greg Koch (Member of Attributed Artist, Drums)
 2007	Drive On Mike Keane (Drums)
 2006	Go! Daryl Stuermer (Drums)
 2005	4 Days in the South Greg Koch (Drums, Vocals-Background)
 2001 Waiting in the Wings Daryl Stuermer
 1997	Double the Gristle Greg Koch (Vocals-Background)
 1996	Sounds of the Leisure Class Records: Midwest Collection (Composer)
 1995	Dog Eared Dream with Willy Porter (Arranger, Main Personnel, Vocals, Drums, Percussion, Composer)

Published works

Personal
Calarco was born in Milwaukee, Wisconsin. He began playing drums when he was ten years old. He has two sons: Anthony and Michael.

References

External links

1966 births
Living people
People from Milwaukee
American drummers
Blues rock musicians
21st-century American male musicians